Langney Priory is the modern name of Langney Grange (now a private house) which served an agricultural manor of several hundred acres providing produce for Lewes Priory Cluniac monastery. It was established before 1121 in the village of Langney, East Sussex, England and is a Grade II* listed building. In addition to the five-bedroom house and monastery, the property contains a detached three-bedroom cottage, a large outbuilding with two garages, a workshop and a store room.

A planning application for conversion into a hotel and conference venue was submitted in April 2019. In 2020, it was listed for sale at £500,000.

In 2022, the Priory was added to English Heritage's list of historic buildings at risk of disrepair and neglect.

See also
Listed buildings in Eastbourne
List of monastic houses in East Sussex

References

Monasteries in East Sussex
Grade II* listed buildings in East Sussex